A Full Moon Consort was a band in the St. Louis area in the 1970s. They have been noted to be "one of the area's top bands" in the mid-1970s.

A Full Moon Consort performed from about the mid-1970s to approximately 1978. A Full Moon Consort included: Chuck Sabatino (vocals, flute, keyboards), Joe Marshall (guitar), Steve Strayhorn (drums),  Joe Truttman (bass) and Dave Timmermann (keyboards, sax, and flute). The band featured members of three earlier bands: Jake Jones, King of Hearts, and The Rockets. Jake Jones was originally from the St. Louis area and released two albums on Kapp Records in the early seventies. No one in the group was actually named "Jake Jones".

The last installment included Dave Ferris (piano/keyboards) and Jim "Peach" Thompson (bass/vocals).

Chuck Sabatino's composition "Elijah" was covered by the Illinois band Head East on their self-titled album "Head East" (1978). Sabatino was also a contributing writer for a number of songs performed by Michael McDonald as well as other artists. He had a stroke while playing for Mike McDonald in Los Angeles in 1994. He died in 1996 in Belleville, Illinois.

The band pioneered live performance in a darkened planetarium with a choreographed light show overhead in 1976 at Abrams Planetarium at Michigan State University. Encore performances were held in 1977 and 1978 at the same venue.

There was a reunion performance at The Stadium Club in Belleville, Illinois, in 1992.They ended the night with the song Elijah.

Joe Marshall still lived in the St. Louis area up to his death on February 26, 2014.  He worked at St. Louis Music until the early 2000s and played frequently through 2010. He taught music classes at Forest Park Community College and later at B-Sharp music school in St. Louis, MO.

Joe Truttman is residing in the Belleville area and is a Chiroproactor.

Steve Strayhorn lived in the St. Louis area and was a member of acclaimed blues band Uncle Albert. He died in 2010.

Joe Marshall and Joe Truttman would often sit in with Steve Strayhorn in the band the Choozy Mothers until Steve died.

Dave Ferris has resided in Los Angeles as a freelance Jazz and Studio player since 1979.

Jim Thompson's whereabouts are unknown.

References

External links
 http://rockclassics.tripod.com/jakejone.html
 http://www.stlmusicyesterdays.com/A%20Full%20Moon%20Consort.htm

Musical groups from St. Louis
Rock music groups from Missouri